Marcos Aurélio de Oliveira Lima (born 10 February 1984), known as Marcos Aurélio, is a Brazilian footballer, who plays as a forward for Altos-PI.

Club career

Third-party ownership era
Marcos Aurélio was signed by Esporte Clube União Suzano on 1 January 2005 in 5-year contract, a proxy for investor. He left for Vila Nova Futebol Clube in 10-month deal in March 2005. In May 2005 he was signed by Ituano.

In the next season he left for Clube Atlético Bragantino in 1-year deal. In April 2006 he was signed by Atlético Paranaense in temporary deal after Bragantino acquired him definitely (but still shared the rights on the players with the "agent" of Aurélio) and extended the contract with Bragantino to last until April 2008.

Santos signed him in 1-year deal in 2007. However Atlético Paranaense also sued to court to claim the damages as the club had automatic renewal clause with Bragantino.

In 2008 Aurélio played for Shimizu S-Pulse, on loan from third-party owner Energy Empreend e Participações (Energy Sports). Santos sold the player's rights to Energy Sports for R$ 1,053,000.

Coritiba
In 2009 Aurélio returned to Brazil and signed a 3-year contract with Brasa Futebol Clube, the subsidiary of Energy Sports. He also immediately left for Coritiba in 2-year loan. In January 2011 Coritiba acquired Aurélio definitely and extended the contract to 31 December 2012.

Internacional
In January 2012 he was signed by Sport Club Internacional.

Honours
 União Barbarense
 Campeonato Brasileiro Série C: 2004

Vila Nova
 Campeonato Goiano: 2005

Santos
 Campeonato Paulista: 2007

Coritiba
 Campeonato Paranaense: 2010, 2011
 Campeonato Brasileiro Série B: 2010

Internacional
 Campeonato Gaúcho: 2012

Ceará
Copa do Nordeste: 2015

Luverdense
 Copa Verde: 2017

References

External links
 
 
 
 
 

1984 births
Living people
People from Cuiabá
Brazilian footballers
Association football forwards
Campeonato Brasileiro Série A players
Campeonato Brasileiro Série B players
Campeonato Brasileiro Série C players
J1 League players
K League 1 players
Brazilian expatriate footballers
Brazilian expatriate sportspeople in Japan
Expatriate footballers in Japan
Brazilian expatriate sportspeople in South Korea
Expatriate footballers in South Korea
União Agrícola Barbarense Futebol Clube players
Vila Nova Futebol Clube players
Ituano FC players
Clube Atlético Bragantino players
Club Athletico Paranaense players
Santos FC players
Shimizu S-Pulse players
Coritiba Foot Ball Club players
Sport Club Internacional players
Sport Club do Recife players
Jeonbuk Hyundai Motors players
Esporte Clube Bahia players
Ceará Sporting Club players
Clube de Regatas Brasil players
Luverdense Esporte Clube players
Botafogo Futebol Clube (PB) players
Sampaio Corrêa Futebol Clube players
Brasiliense Futebol Clube players
Sportspeople from Mato Grosso